Chris Kelly (born November 29, 1982) is a Canadian podcast producer and film composer/musician based in Vancouver, British Columbia. He is also co-founder of the production company Kelly&Kelly.

Career
Kelly started his podcasting career at CBC, where he produced the corporation’s first podcast, the CBC Radio 3 Podcast with Grant Lawrence. He then went on to co-create, with Pat Kelly and Peter Oldring, CBC Radio One's This Is That, a satirical current affairs show that has won multiple Canadian Comedy Awards. Also while at the CBC he worked for Spark, As It Happens, and DNTO.

After CBC, he co-founded branded podcast company Pacific Content. In 2016, he left Pacific Content to start Kelly&Kelly with Pat Kelly. With that company they have created such podcasts as This Sounds Serious, Dexter Guff Is Smarter Than You, Celeste & Her Best, and created a number of viral videos.

Kelly's musician career includes being a member of the bands Analog Bell Service, The Choir Practice, Colin Cowan & the Elastic Stars and Rob Butterfield, as well as playing at major music festivals, such as SXSW in Texas.

Kelly's film composition debut was the Brent Hodge directed documentary A Brony Tale, a film about the bronies, teenage and adult fans of the television show My Little Pony: Friendship is Magic.

Personal life 
Kelly is married to Lauren Bercovitch.

Discography
 Chris Kelly - Company Man
The Comet - The Comet is Coming
Colin Cowan & the Elastic Stars - Fall Paths
 A Brony Tale: Music from the Motion Picture

Podcast Credits

Film and Video

References

External links

1982 births
Canadian indie rock musicians
Canadian radio producers
Canadian film score composers
Place of birth missing (living people)
Male film score composers
Musicians from Vancouver
Living people